Julien Duval (born 27 May 1990) is a French former professional racing cyclist, who last rode for UCI WorldTeam . He rode at the 2015 UCI Track Cycling World Championships, and was named in the startlist for the 2017 Vuelta a España. Duval retired from competition at the end of the 2021 season.

Major results

2007
 2nd  Team pursuit, UEC European Junior Track Championships
2008
 1st  Team pursuit, UEC European Junior Track Championships
2010
 3rd  Team pursuit, UEC European Under-23 Track Championships
2013
 1st  Mountains classification, Four Days of Dunkirk
 2nd Overall Paris–Arras Tour
1st  Points classification
 3rd Paris–Troyes
 5th Grand Prix de la Ville de Lillers
 7th Grand Prix de Denain
 9th Overall Boucles de la Mayenne
2014
 3rd Overall Paris–Arras Tour
1st Stage 1 (TTT)
 5th Classic Loire Atlantique
 8th Route Adélie
 8th La Roue Tourangelle
2015
 9th Route Adélie
 10th Classica Corsica
2016
 3rd La Roue Tourangelle
 3rd Polynormande
 5th Boucles de l'Aulne
 6th Tour de Vendée
 7th Overall Boucles de la Mayenne
 9th Grand Prix d'Isbergues
2018
 3rd Grand Prix de Denain
2019
 5th Tour de l'Eurométropole
 9th Grand Prix de Fourmies
 9th Paris–Chauny

Grand Tour general classification results timeline

References

External links
 

1990 births
Living people
French male cyclists
Sportspeople from Évreux
Cyclists from Normandy
21st-century French people